Browntown is an unincorporated community along U.S. Route 6 in Wyalusing Township, Pennsylvania, United States. It is part of Northeastern Pennsylvania. The community borders the Susquehanna River.

Notes

Unincorporated communities in Bradford County, Pennsylvania
Unincorporated communities in Pennsylvania